Lucky Legs is a 1942 American comedy film directed by Charles Barton and written by Stanley Rubin and Jack Hartfield. The film stars Jinx Falkenburg, Leslie Brooks, Kay Harris, Russell Hayden, Elizabeth Patterson and William Wright. The film was released on October 1, 1942, by Columbia Pictures.

Plot
Chorus girl Gloria Carroll inherits one million dollars from Broadway playboy Herbert Dinwiddle. Producer Ned McLane persuades her to advance him the money on a production called "Lucky Legs" that will star her. The will causes problems in two places; Racketeer Pinky Connors is mad as the money is his as Dinwiddle was really his absconding bookkeeper, and, in Elmville, Dinwiddle's two spinster sisters, Annabelle Dinwiddle and Henrietta Dinwiddle, learn they are getting $10,000 each. Pinkie's lawyer suggests he get power-of-attorney over Gloria's funds. Henrietta wants to contest the will, hires a local young law school graduate, Jimmy Abercrombie and the trio set off for New York. Jimmy obtains an injunction against Pinkie that also serves to shut off McLane's credit for "Lucky Legs." To open the show and provide employment for her roommates, "Calamity" Jane Edwards and Jewel Perkins, Gloria offers to settle for $25,000 with Henrietta, who refuses. Annebelle, who likes Gloria, arranges for Pinkie to kidnap her, the ransom being Henrietta's withdrawal of her half of the injunction. Pinkie's henchmen make a mistake and kidnap Annabelle instead.

Cast          
Jinx Falkenburg as Gloria Carroll
Leslie Brooks as Jewel Perkins
Kay Harris as 'Calamity' Jane Edwards
Russell Hayden as James Abercrombie
Elizabeth Patterson as Annabelle Dinwiddie
William Wright as Pemberton 'Pinkie' Connors
Don Beddoe as Ned McLane
Adele Rowland as Hettie Dinwiddie
Eddie Marr as Mike Manley
George McKay as Rod Fenton
James C. Morton as Pat
Eddie Kane as J.N. Peters

References

External links
 

1942 films
1940s English-language films
American comedy films
1942 comedy films
Columbia Pictures films
Films directed by Charles Barton
American black-and-white films
1940s American films